Cafe Campagne is a Black-owned French restaurant on Post Alley in Seattle's Pike Place Market, in the U.S. state of Washington. Daisley Gordon is the owner.

The menu has included asparagus salad, brioche french toast, pan-roasted chicken, oeufs en meurette, and quiches. The Seattle Metropolitan included the business in a 2022 overview of the city's 100 best restaurants.

See also 

 List of Black-owned restaurants
 List of French restaurants

References

External links 
 
 
 Cafe Campagne at Zomato

Black-owned restaurants in the United States
Central Waterfront, Seattle
French restaurants in Seattle
Pike Place Market